The initials TFH can refer to the following:

TFH Publications, an American publisher specialising in books on pets
The Falcon's Hangar, a Singapore distributor/retailer of collectible toys
The Flat Hat, student newspaper at the College of William & Mary
Tin-foil hat, an item of headgear
Tropical Fish Hobbyist, a fishkeeping magazine
Follicular B helper T cells (TFH), an immune cell that provides a helper function to B cells
 A widely used acronym for US District Court Judge Thomas F. Hogan
Touch For Health, a complementary therapy, related to Applied kinesiology
Tung Fat Ho, a Hong Kong Building Material Supplier specialize on Architecture Builders' hardware/ Ironmongery with history go back from 1950
Them's Fightin' Herds, a fighting video game for PC